Clothes and the Woman is a 1937 British romance film directed by Albert de Courville and starring Rod La Rocque, Tucker McGuire and Constance Collier. It was made at Elstree Studios. While enjoying a holiday in the resort of Cannes, a young woman meets and falls in love with a man. However, worried that she is too plain she decides to dress more fashionably.

Cast
 Rod La Rocque as Eric Thrale 
 Tucker McGuire as Joan Moore 
 Constance Collier as Eugenia 
 George E. Stone as Count Bernhardt 
 Dorothy Dare as Carol Dixon 
 Alastair Sim as Francois 
 Mona Goya as Cecilie 
 Mary Cole as Marie Thrale 
 Jim Gérald as Enrico Castigliani 
 Renee Gadd as Schoolmistress

References

Bibliography
 Low, Rachael. Filmmaking in 1930s Britain. George Allen & Unwin, 1985.
 Wood, Linda. British Films, 1927-1939. British Film Institute, 1986.

External links

1937 films
British romance films
British black-and-white films
1930s romance films
Films directed by Albert de Courville
Films shot at Station Road Studios, Elstree
Films set in Cannes
Films with screenplays by Franz Schulz
1930s English-language films
1930s British films
English-language romance films